The ALCO S-1 and S-3 were  switcher diesel-electric locomotives produced by ALCO and their Canadian subsidiary Montreal Locomotive Works (MLW).  The two locomotives differed only in trucks, with the S-1 using ALCO's own Blunt trucks, and the S-3 using AAR type A switcher trucks.  The S-1 was built between April 1940 and June 1950, with a total of 543 completed, while the S-3 was constructed between February 1950 and November 1953 (MLW until 1957) with total sales of 300.  A modified version, the S-10, was built by MLW only; 13 were built between January and June 1958.

Identification 
The S-1 and S-3 are distinguishable externally from the very similar S-2 and S-4  switchers in that they have a smaller exhaust stack with a round base and a smaller radiator shutter area on the nose sides.  The S-1/S-3 radiator shutter area is taller than it is wide, while the S-2/S-4 radiator area is wider.  The smaller stack is due to the lack of turbocharging.

The S-10 is not externally distinguishable from later Canadian-built S-3 locomotives; it differed mostly in electrical equipment.

Original owners 
The S-1 and S-3 models were sold to an extensive list of railroads and industrial operators, as detailed below.  Major owners of the S-1 included the New York Central Railroad (NYC), with 71 locomotives; the New Haven with 65 locomotives; the L&N with 45 locomotives; the C&NW, with 29 locomotives; and the Pennsylvania Railroad (PRR) with 27 locomotives.  Major customers for the S-3 included the CP, with 101; the CN, with 49; the NYC, with 43 locomotives; the B&M, with 16; and the PRR, with 13.  The MLW S-10 was sold only to the CP.

The totals below include export orders and MLW-built locomotives.

S-1 
ALCO constructed approximately 535 S-1s for the US market between 1940–1950.

S-3 
ALCO and the Montreal Locomotive Works constructed approximately 300 S-3s for the North American market between 1950–1957.

S-10 
MLW constructed 13 S-10s in 1958, all for the Canadian Pacific Railway, numbered 6601–6613. These units were essentially similar to late-built S3s, though with minor updates to the electrical gear.

S-11 
In 1959, MLW built a final order of 660 horsepower switchers for the Canadian Pacific, as model S-11, numbered 6614–6623. The internal machinery of these units was essentially the same as that of the S-10, but the car body was radically redesigned, with the radiator on the front end of the hood instead of on the sides.

Preservation 

Numerous S-1 and S-3 locomotives remain in use, and several are preserved:
 Ex-U.S. Army S-1  7372 is at the Western Pacific Railroad Museum and painted in Western Pacific colors.
 Ex-Canadian Pacific MLW S-3  6568 is at the Saskatchewan Railway Museum.
Two Ex-Steel Company of Wales S-1s are preserved and are being restored to working order at the Nene Valley Railway in England.

See also 
 List of ALCO diesel locomotives
 List of MLW diesel locomotives

References

External links 

 Alco/MLW S-1 Roster
 Alco/MLW S-3 Roster

B-B locomotives
S-01 and S-3
S-03
Railway locomotives introduced in 1950
Railway locomotives introduced in 1940
Diesel-electric locomotives of the United States
Standard gauge locomotives of the United States
Standard gauge locomotives of Canada
Standard gauge locomotives of Great Britain
Standard gauge locomotives of Mexico
Diesel-electric locomotives of Mexico
Diesel-electric locomotives of Great Britain
Diesel-electric locomotives of Canada